The second season of Vietnam's Got Talent, a Vietnamese reality television talent show, was aired Sunday nights in the prime time slot of 8:00PM (UTC+7) starting from December 2, 2012 on VTV3 and MTV Vietnam. The show is based on the Got Talent series format, which was originated by Simon Cowell in the United Kingdom.

All three judges from the first season, Thành Lộc, Thúy Hạnh and Huy Tuấn, returned. Thanh Bạch replaced Quyền Linh and Chi Bảo as presenter.

The show was primarily produced by Vietnam Television and BHD Corp, with additional broadcasting by MTV Vietnam. The performance shows were aired Sundays on VTV3.

Auditions
Auditions were initially held in 9 major cities.

Process

Semi-final rounds

The acts are listed of chronological appearance.

1st Semi-final (February 03–05)
Celebrity performer: Thu Minh ("Yêu Mình Anh")

Judges' vote (between Nguyễn Công Đạt & Oxy)
 Thành Lộc: Oxy
 Thúy Hạnh: Nguyễn Công Đạt
 Huy Tuấn: Nguyễn Công Đạt

2nd Semi-final (February 24–26) 
Celebrity performer: Anh Khoa, Nam Hương, Rapper Wowy ("Tôi tìm thấy tôi")

Judges' vote (between Kran Jan & Free Style)
Thành Lộc: Kran Jan
Huy Tuấn: Kran Jan
Thúy Hạnh: Kran Jan

3rd Semi-final (March 03–05)
Celebrity performer: 365 Band ("Ai đó đêm nay")

Judges' vote (between Thanh Phong Martial Art & Trần Trọng Tân)
Thúy Hạnh: Võ Đường Thanh Phong
Thành Lộc: Võ Đường Thanh Phong 
Huy Tuấn: Võ Đường Thanh Phong look like

4th Semi Final (March 10–12)
Celebrity performer: Mỹ Linh ("Mãi bên con")

Judges' vote (between Tô Mạnh Linh & Lý Bằng)
Huy Tuấn: Lý Bằng
Thúy Hạnh: Tô Mạnh Linh
Thành Lộc: Lý Bằng

5th Semi Final (March 17–19)
Celebrity performer: Hồng Nhung ("And Đừng Đi")

Judges' vote (between HFO & Nguyễn Hải Lam)
Thành Lộc: HFO
Thúy Hạnh: Nguyễn Hải Lam
Huy Tuấn: I like red, but i choose black (HFO)
Remark: Tường Vi Vân pressed the buzzer by herself suddenly during the show.

6th Semi-final (March 24–26)
Celebrity performer: Hiền Thục ("Chuyện hẹn hò")

Judges' vote (between Cao Hà Đức Anh & Lương Hồng Khánh An)
Thành Lộc: Cao Hà Đức Anh
Thúy Hạnh: Cao Hà Đức Anh
Huy Tuấn: Cao Hà Đức Anh

7th Semi-final (March 31-April 02)
Celebrity performer: MTV Band

Judges' vote (between Huỳnh Văn Sáu & Nguyễn Thị Huyền Trang)
Thành Lộc: Nguyễn Thị Huyền Trang
Thúy Hạnh: Nguyễn Thị Huyền Trang
Huy Tuấn: Nguyễn Thị Huyền Trang

Final rounds
The Final rounds consisted of 14 acts from the semi-final rounds spread out over two shows aired on 7 and 14 April 2013

Final round 1 (April 07)
The 1st final round was aired on April 7, 2013, filmed in BHD Studio in district 9 of Ho Chi Minh City.

Final round 2 (April 14)
The 2nd final round was aired on April 14, 2013, filmed in BHD Studio in district 9 of Ho Chi Minh City.

Wild Card

Grand Finale
The Grand Finale consisted of the top 4 performance from the final rounds and was aired live on 21 April 2013 from Lan Anh stadium.

References

Vietnam's Got Talent
2010s Vietnamese television series
2012 Vietnamese television seasons
2013 Vietnamese television seasons